João Paulo Valadão Corvelo (born 1981, in Flores Island) is a Portuguese veterinary physician and politician, member of the Legislative Assembly of the Azores, elected in 2016, for the Flores Island constituency.

He is known for having been the youngest European president of a civil parish, at age 20, when he was first elected president of the Junta de Freguesia of Cedros, in 2001. João Corvelo is also nephew of the historic Azorean Communist deputy Paulo Valadão, his maternal uncle.

References

21st-century Portuguese politicians
Living people
1981 births
Portuguese Communist Party politicians
People from Flores Island (Azores)
Members of the Legislative Assembly of the Azores